Schinia oleagina is a moth of the family Noctuidae. It is found in most of the western half of North America.

The wingspan is about 27 mm.

The larvae feed on Brickellia.

External links
Images
Butterflies and Moths of North America

Schinia
Moths of North America
Moths described in 1875